Margaret Miller or Maggie Miller may refer to:

Margaret Carnegie Miller (1897–1990), American and philanthropist
Margaret C. Miller, Canadian archaeologist
Margaret Miller (politician), Canadian politician
Margaret Stevenson Miller, (1896–1979) British lecturer and researcher
Maggie Miller (mathematician)
Peggy Miller, see Tales of the Riverbank

See also
Margaret Millar (disambiguation)